Wilfried Kohlars (28 October 1939 – 5 June 2019) was a German football player. He spent seven seasons in the Bundesliga with TSV 1860 München.

Honours
 UEFA Cup Winners' Cup finalist: 1964–65
 Bundesliga champion: 1965–66
 Bundesliga runner-up: 1966–67
 DFB-Pokal winner: 1963–64

References

External links
 

1939 births
2019 deaths
People from Troisdorf
Sportspeople from Cologne (region)
People from the Rhine Province
German footballers
TSV 1860 Munich players
Bundesliga players
Association football midfielders
Footballers from North Rhine-Westphalia
West German footballers